RW1 may refer to:

 Rogalski and Wigura R.W.1, a Polish light plane from 1927.
 RagWing RW1 Ultra-Piet, an ultralight aircraft design
 (8258) 1982 RW1, a minor planet